The Hearst Ranch is composed of two cattle ranches in central California. He also bought most of  Rancho San Simeon, and part of Rancho Santa Rosa, two other adjacent land grants. 

The other ranch is the  Jack Ranch at Cholame, California, which was acquired by the Hearst Corporation in 1966. The Jack Ranch comprises most of Rancho Cholame, an 1844 land grant, plus additional lands. The ranch's Circle C brand is the oldest registered brand in use in California.

A third collection of Hearst ranches was acquired by the Army to form Fort Hunter Liggett.

Description
The Hearst ranch produces branded grass-fed beef for the retail markets, selling primarily to Whole Foods in Southern California. The ranch is managed by Stephen Thompson Hearst, the great-grandson of William Randolph Hearst.  The ranch is permanently protected under a conservation agreement signed in 2005 by the Hearst Corporation, American Land Conservancy, California Rangeland Trust, and the State of California.

References

External links
 

Hearst family residences
Ranches in California
Protected areas of San Luis Obispo County, California